Live at the Sahara Tahoe is the first live album by American soul musician Isaac Hayes, released in 1973 by Stax Records' Enterprise imprint. It was recorded live at the Sahara Hotel & Casino in Stateline, Nevada. The performance was arranged and orchestrated by Onzie Horne.

Track listing

References

Isaac Hayes live albums
1973 live albums
Stax Records live albums